No Ceilings is a mixtape by American rapper Lil Wayne. It was scheduled to be released on October 31, 2009, but was leaked before the official date. No Ceilings was officially released on October 31, 2009, with 4 additional tracks. The mixtape is available as a free and legal download and it received widespread acclaim from critics. An abridged version was officially released to streaming services on August 28, 2020, excluding ten songs.

Recording and release 
Two Lil Wayne tracks, "Wasted" and "Swag Surf," were leaked onto the internet on October 11. These were followed by "Run This Town" on October 25. The majority of the mixtape was leaked out to the public on multiple websites October 26, 2009. The mixtape contains various freestyles over popular rap and R&B songs' instrumentals and features artists from his Young Money label including Nicki Minaj, Short Dawg, Gudda Gudda, Shanell, Jae Millz, and Tyga. It was officially released on weareyoungmoney.com via a live Ustream video and included higher quality audio as well as four additional tracks. The song "Single" was released on May 11, 2010 as a single on iTunes titled "I'm Single", and charted on the Billboard Hot 100 chart. The single was also released on Wayne's I Am Not a Human Being album. The song "No Ceilings" was released to iTunes under the title "Pop That" on the Loyalty EP, which also included Birdman's new single "Loyalty", which featured Tyga and Lil Wayne.

When police pulled over Wayne's tour bus after claiming to smell marijuana, the rapper pleaded guilty to "attempted criminal possession of a weapon." Although pleading guilty still landed Wayne in Riker's Island Prison for a year, it greatly reduced his possible sentence. Wayne was dealing with his arrest and charges while writing the mixtape, and he actually mentions his arrest multiple times in lyrics throughout the tape.

Critical reception

Reviewing in April 2010 for MSN Music, Robert Christgau hailed No Ceilings as Lil Wayne's best release since Tha Carter III and a "welcome alternative" to his contemporaneous rock album Rebirth (2010). Noting a richness and humor in his lyrics, the critic said that Lil Wayne "recycles beats from Dirty South throwaways whose originals you need never think of again, shows Fabolous how fabulous the 'Throw It in the Bag' remix might have been, holds his own with Jay-Z and the Black Eyed Peas, and eases the mixtape's title onto every track". In another piece for The Barnes & Noble Review, Christgau elaborated on his praise, but also offered points of criticism: "[T]his is a gift except when some dolt like Tyga or Jae Milz [sic] gets a verse ... though the boasts are mostly prime and the rhymes fun enough, it's all pretty surface—there's nothing as tricky as 'Walk It Out,' much less 'I Feel Like Dying.' And the occasional references to his forthcoming [prison bid] are strictly by the book." Christgau later ranked No Ceilings as the 18th best album of the year.

Sequel 

A sequel mixtape, No Ceilings 2, was confirmed on the 6-year anniversary of the original mixtape's release by Mack Maine on his Twitter page. Lil Wayne performed his freestyle over Future's "Where Ya At?" at an event prior to its release and two 30-second clips of that performance can be found online. He also recorded his freestyle over Drake's "Back To Back" before an interview.

Commercial release
On August 28, 2020, over 10 years from the initial free release, the mixtape was released to streaming platforms. The commercial release omitted all 3 skits and 7 songs, presumed to be due to sample clearance issues. A bonus track titled "Kobe Bryant" was also included. It is a rework of Wayne's 2009 song with the same title.

Track listing 

The mixtape's 2020 streaming edition excluded 10 tracks, 3 of them being skits, while adding the song "Kobe Bryant".

Charts

References

External links 
 Lil Wayne – No Ceilings Mixtape stream and download

Lil Wayne albums
2009 mixtape albums
Albums produced by Cool & Dre
Albums produced by Noah "40" Shebib
Albums produced by The Legendary Traxster
Albums produced by Fatboi